Hemşin River or Pazar River (Laz language: Zuğa River) is one of the main water streams of Hemşin and Pazar districts in the eastern Black Sea Region of Turkey.

Description  
Hemşin River rises in Gito Highlands in Hemşin. It is a popular place for amateur handline fishing.

References 

Rivers of Rize Province
Pazar, Rize